Ab Chendaran, also known as Ab Chendar-e Gelal, may refer to:
 Ab Chendaran-e Olya Gelal
 Ab Chendaran-e Sofla Gelal
 Ab Chendaran-e Tal Deraz